Tant is a surname. Notable people with the surname include:

Allison Tant (born 1961), American politician
Ed Tant (fl. 1974–), American journalist and political activist
Jay Tant (born 1977), American football player
Paul Tant (1945–2014), Belgian politician

Surnames of European origin